Tata Communications Limited (previously known as Videsh Sanchar Nigam Limited) is an Indian telecommunications company. It was previously a government- owned-telecommunications service provider and under the ownership of Department of Telecommunications, Ministry of Communications, and the Government of India. It was then sold to Tata Group when the Atal Bihari Vajpayee-Bharatiya Janta Party-National Democratic Alliance was in power; presently the company is part of the Tata Group.

The company has invested US$1.19 billion in its global subsea fibre network. It provides network services and software-defined network platforms, such as Ethernet, SD-WAN, content delivery networks (CDNs), the internet, Multiprotocol Label Switching (MPLS), and private lines. It has more than 400 points of presence (PoPs) with a data centre, Cloud (Private Cloud and Puiblic Cloud Management) and co-location in 44 sites.

It is listed on the Bombay Stock Exchange and the National Stock Exchange of India. It also holds a stake on its Sri Lankan subsidiaries, Tata Communications Lanka.

The company is listed as one of AON Hewitt's Best Employers in India for 2017.

History
The business was founded as Videsh Sanchar Nigam Limited (VSNL) in 1986.  Under the chairmanship of B. K. Syngal (1991-1998), VSNL launched the first publicly-available Internet plans in India in 1995. After the Government of India launched Disinvestment of Public Sector Units in India, The international arm of VSNL (VSNL International) was launched in 2004. VSNL was completely acquired by the Tata Group and renamed as Tata Communications on 13 February 2008.

Tata communications global network

In 2009, Tata Communications and Tyco Telecommunications completed the TGN-Intra Asia cable system.

In 2012, the company completed its network across Egypt linking Europe to India, and created a subsea fibre network that circumnavigates the world. The  Eurasian section of the Tata Global Network runs across the Mediterranean Sea and the Middle East, connecting Mumbai with Marseilles.

The company has more than 15 terabits per second of international bandwidth lit capacity.

In January 2016, Windstream Communications announced it was extending its 100 Gigabit Ethernet (100G) network from New Jersey data center operator NJFX's presence at Tata's Cable Landing Station (CLS) in Wall Township, New Jersey, to Ashburn, Virginia's internet hub.

Services

Network and connectivity services

Ethernet
Tata Communications offers Ethernet services that can connect its customers in global offices at speeds of up to 10 Gbit/s in point-to-point or multipoint configurations.

Its Global Network provides flexible bandwidth options from 2 MB up to 10,000 MB using Fast-E, Gig-E, and 10 Gig-E. Its ethernet services include: global dedicated ethernet, external ethernet network-to-network interface, low latency ethernet and ethernet over MPLS.

Ethernet over MPLS is a high-performance, global MPLS backbone that streams audio video, live broadcasts, and IP services with the scalability and security of a private network.

Its Ethernet services are certified by the MEF—a worldwide non-profit organization dedicated to improving carrier-class Ethernet products and services.

International Private Line 
Tata Communications International Private Line offers customers a variety of routing, uptime, and service options for global communications. It delivers voice, video and data connectivity. It is built on its subsea cable network, including a fibre-optic ring, and more than 20 consortium cables covering  over 200 countries and territories.

Content Delivery Network 
In February 2011, as part of a strategy to enhance its global content delivery network (CDN), Tata Communications acquired BitGravity, a US-based CDN provider. This acquisition enabled it to offer its customers a cloud-based service for content delivery, including the delivery of HTML, CSS, JavaScript, videos and live streaming HD. This service was then integrated with other support services, like security, satellite teleports, fibre-based video network and transcoding.

Data Centres 
Tata Communications has a data centre network located in 44 locations worldwide. Tata Communications data centres meet international standards for redundancy, and are integrated directly with its global IP network. Its collocation services provide regulated power, cooling and physical security for the server, storage and networking equipment. In May 2016, in order to redeploy capital in other areas of its business, Tata Communications sold a 74% stake in its data centre business to Singapore Technologies Telemedia.

Unified Communications and Collaboration 
Tata Communications delivers a portfolio of Unified Communication and Collaboration (UCC) solutions worldwide. These services include: Global SIP Connect, Unified Conferencing, Unified Communications as a Service (UCaaS) and Hosted contact centre.

Global SIP Connect 
On 18 January 2016, Tata Communications launched a white-label Unified Communications solution called Global SIP Connect. This solution was designed to address the voice requirements of its enterprise customers, while simultaneously expanding its Unified Communications portfolio. The SIP Trunking solution enables its service provider customers to consolidate and manage voice services, while providing all global on-net and off-net voice services to link their businesses globally.

Unified Communications as a Service (UCaaS) 
Tata Communications Unified Communications as a Service (UCaaS) integrates and works with other service provider solutions including Microsoft and Cisco. Its global UC services on the Microsoft Skype for Business platform provide a solution including conferencing, online meetings, instant messaging, voice and video.

Hosted Contact Centre Services (CCaaS) 
Tata Communications InstaCC was launched at Enterprise Connect 2015 in Orlando on 16 March 2015. This initial offering has been supplemented with Amazon Connect and Cisco Webex Contact Centre. Hosted contact centre solutions include support for outbound and omni-channel communications, enabling enterprise customers to quickly establish contact centres and call centres.

Cloud Services 
In October 2014, Tata Communications launched its IZO platform, “a global platform for enhanced hybrid multi cloud enablement”. Tata Communications IZO Cloud Platform brings together 20+ cloud providers, three large hyperscale cloud platforms and 43+ data centres, that its customers can interconnect with.

IZO Cloud Platform and Services 
Under the IZO Cloud and Managed Hosting Services portfolio, Tata Communications provides various cloud and hosting solutions like Private Cloud (IZO Private Cloud), Container Services (IZO Cloud Containers), Managed Kubernetes, Cloud Storage (IZO Cloud Storage), Big Data/Analytics Platform (IZO Cloud Analytics Platform) and Public Cloud Assessment, Migration and Management under the IZO Managed Cloud for AWS, AZURE, GCP. Tata Communications also offers SAP HANA Hosting on Any cloud platforms(Private or Public), VDI solutions on Any Cloud, Govt. Community Cloud (GCC) and in July 2021, the organisation launched its latest product IZO Financial Cloud - a purpose built community Cloud platform for Financial Industry, apart from this, the organisation offers Managed Hosting Services etc. Tata Communications also offers Colocation services in the international market.

IZO Internet WAN 
Tata Communications IZO Internet WAN is a global-internet-based WAN service. This service can be integrated with Tata Communications Global VPN solution to build a global hybrid network. IZO Internet WAN reaches 42 countries, 700+ cities, over 1 million buildings and covers 85% of the world's GDP.

IZO Private Connect 
IZO Private Connect links businesses to leading cloud service providers including Amazon Web Services, Microsoft Azure, Google, Office 365 and Salesforce.com. Its customers can connect using MPLS or Ethernet and gain access to Ethernet connectivity to Tata Communications’ data centres and across 85 third party data centres globally. In addition to global connections, IZO Private Connect is available in 6 data centres in India. IZO Private Connect is now expanding to include internet direct connectivity in addition to MPLS and Ethernet. Connection speeds are available from 2 MB to 10 GB.

IZO Public Connect 
IZO Public Connect is a cloud enablement service that provides a route for Tata Communications’ enterprise customers by tagging their data packets for pre-determined delivery over the public internet.

IZO SD-WAN 
In November 2016, Tata Communications launched its new addition to the IZO platform, IZO SDWAN. The solution, delivered as a managed service, combines IZO WAN with software-defined and virtualised network technologies in 130+ countries. IZO SDWAN cloud service gateways are built next to cloud service providers in 20 locations across the globe.

Media Services 
Tata Communications provides a range of services and solutions for enterprises in all segments of media and entertainment, including gaming, hospitality, sports, leisure, education, news, music, cable and broadcasting.

In April 2015, Tata Communications launched its "Media Ecosystem". The ecosystem combines traditional video contribution services with IP-connectivity. Services include: asset management, workflow management, channel origination, internet contribution feeds, OTT platform and transcoding as a service.

In December 2022, it was announced Tata Communications had acquired the New York-headquartered live video production and delivery company, The Switch Enterprises and a number of its international assets, for a value of approximately US$58.8 million.

Security and Fraud Prevention

Managed Security 
Tata Communications offers a complete array of managed security services, that provides enterprise customers with 24x7x365 protection from attacks. Its managed security offering includes firewalls, threat management, intrusion detection and prevention, DDoS detection and mitigation, email security, vulnerability testing and management.

Fraud Prevention 
Tata Communications offers a fraud prevention toolkit to identify and proactively prevent fraudulent call activity. The toolkit uses technologies including big data, analytics, machine learning, crowd sourcing, real-time monitoring, subscriber alerts and automated reporting.

The toolkit monitors 30 million calls per day for fraud, and blocks over 400,000 fraudulent calls every day. When the fraud fighting toolkit identifies a fraudulent call, Tata Communications blocks the number across its entire network.

Mobility Services

Mobile Roaming 
Tata Communications combined its Diameter Signalling exchange (DSX) platform with its IPX Connect service to offer its customers 3G/4G roaming. It provides a solution for LTE roaming migration, supporting 2G, 3G and 4G roaming within one framework. This framework addresses signalling, routing, inter-working, transport, clearing, settlement, business intelligence, security and service assurance.

Signalling 
With an on-net signalling network, directly connecting 300 mobile network operators and with reach to 800+ mobile network operators, Tata Communication's interconnects mobile ecosystem organisations for messaging and roaming.

Its signalling services can be delivered over a number of network options including TDM, IP, Global VPN and IPX Connect (SCCP over IPX). Also supported is signalling evolution from SCCP to Diameter, supporting IMS and LTE roaming capabilities.

Mobile Messaging 
Tata Communications mobile messaging platform provides an A2P SMS hub environment. The Mobile Messaging Exchange provides a connection between mobile messaging originators and mobile network operators. Tata Communications partners with Anam for SMS firewall services, designed to provide reliable and secure SMS delivery for Tata Communications' customers.

Internet of Things

Tata Communications MOVE is an IoT Connectivity Management Platform, providing global mobile connectivity for a range of connected devices, from cars to consumer electronics. The platform leverages Tata Communications’ global mobile network operator relationships to offer a technology neutral approach that supports cellular connected device connections around the world. Tata Communications also manages an LP-WAN network in India, using LoRa technology to support an array of smart city, smart manufacturing, Smart Grid, Smart Meter and transportation applications.

Wholesale Voice

Wholesale Voice Transport & Termination 
Tata Communications offers international wholesale voice transit and termination services with the support of its global network.. It provides full support for HD Voice, complies with GSMA's IPX specifications for direct transit and is future proof for operators migrating to Voice over LTE.

International Voice Access Services 
Tata Communications provides its customers with a full suite of  Voice Access Services, that cover 105 countries. Customers can receive toll-free calls from both fixed and mobile phones in more than 90 countries with ITFS. They can provide a single number that is accessible from more than 45 countries worldwide, with UIFN. It also enables customers to purchase local number ranges, through its Bulk Local Number Service offering.

Wifi+ 
In June 2016, Tata Communications launched its Wi-Fi+, a cloud communications solutions for its mobile network operator customers. Operators are able to provide their customers with unlimited calling, messaging and data over high-quality, secure Wi-Fi. It harnesses Tata Communications’ Cloud RTC expertise and iPass's more than 21 million Wi-Fi hotspots in more than 100 countries.

In January 2017, Tata Communications announced its partnership with Bharat Sanchar Nigam Limited (BSNL) to provide 44 million Wi-Fi hotspots in more than 100 countries, including rail systems and international flights. In October 2021 Tata Communications announced the availability support for WiFi6, in collaboration with its partner Cisco.

Subsidiaries of Tata Communications Ltd
Tata Communications Transformation Services (TCTS), a 100% subsidiary of Tata Communications Ltd, provides business transformation, managed network operations, network outsourcing, and consultancy services to telecommunication companies around the world.

Tata Communications Payment Solutions Limited (TCPSL) formerly known as Tata Communications Banking InfraSolutions, is a wholly owned subsidiary of Tata Communications. TCPSL is one of the fastest growing Payment Solutions specialists in India offering end-to-end B2B and B2C solutions. Being a 100% Banking and Financial Services focused organisation, TCPSL offers one stop payment solutions to all categories of banks including PSU, Private, MNC and Co-operative banks. TCPSL's White Label ATM offering under the brand name Indicash marks its foray in the B2C space. With this it is the first White Label ATM service provider in the country. Under this service offering, TCPSL offers ATM services across the country through Indicash ATM network with special focus on semi urban and rural areas.

Innovation Hub 
In September 2019, PGA European Tour and Tata Communications launched the Innovation Hub. This contest that offers the opportunity for start-ups worldwide to convert concepts into reality.
 Winner 2020: Alugha

References

External links
 

Companies based in Mumbai
Telecommunications companies of India
Internet service providers of India
Telecommunications companies established in 1986
Tier 1 networks
1986 establishments in Maharashtra
Formerly government-owned companies of India
Tata Communications
Companies listed on the National Stock Exchange of India
Companies listed on the Bombay Stock Exchange